Krigia biflora, also known as two-flower cynthia or two-flower dwarf dandelion, is a species of plant in the family Asteraceae. It is native to North America, where it is found in central Canada (Manitoba and Ontario) and in the eastern, central, and southwestern United States.  This species is rare in Connecticut, and it is listed as a species of special concern.

There are no disc flowers. It can be an aggressively spreading plant. It grows in a variety of habitats and soils and blooms in late spring to late summer. The name of the plant consists of two words: Krigia for David Krieg, the German physician who first collected this plant in Maryland; and biflora, meaning two-flowered. Its habitats include streams, meadows, and moist prairies.

References

Cichorieae
Flora of Canada
Flora of the United States
Plants described in 1788